Robert C. "Bunny" Bell (10 April 1911 – 25 December 1988) was a footballer who played for Carlton, Tranmere Rovers and Everton.

On Boxing Day 1935, he scored nine times in Tranmere's 13–4 victory over Oldham Athletic, at that time an English record. He might have made it 10, but missed a penalty. He scored 57 goals for Tranmere during the 1933–34 season, and ended his Tranmere career with 104 goals in 114 games. Bell then signed for Everton, but the outbreak of World War II effectively ended his career.

References 

Association football forwards
Tranmere Rovers F.C. players
Everton F.C. players
Sportspeople from Birkenhead
English footballers
English Football League players
1911 births
1988 deaths